Donji Kraljevec is a village and municipality in Međimurje County, Croatia.

Geography and demographics

In the 2011 census, the municipality had a population of 4,659. Of the entire population, a total of 4,578 people (98.3%) identified themselves as Croats.

The village of Donji Kraljevec is located around 20 kilometres south-east of Čakovec, the county seat and largest city of Međimurje County, and just over 4 kilometres north-east of Prelog, the second largest city of the county. In the 2001 census, the village had a population of 1,694 and was also the largest village in the municipality.

In addition to Donji Kraljevec (population 1560), there were five other villages belonging to the municipality during the 2011 census:
Donji Hrašćan – 547 people
Donji Pustakovec – 286 people
Hodošan – 1,254 people
Palinovec – 712 people
Sveti Juraj u Trnju – 300 people

Sport
The nearby Stadium Milenium is a speedway stadium and hosts the Speedway Grand Prix of Croatia.

Notable people
 Rudolf Steiner - philosopher

References

External links
 Official site

Municipalities of Croatia
Populated places in Međimurje County